Normunds Lasis (born 25 February 1985) is a Latvian former cyclist.

Palmares

2004
2nd National Road Race Championships
2005
1st Prologue Tour of Greece
3rd National Road Race Championships
2006
1st Mayor Cup
2007
1st Stage 1 Triptyque des Monts et Châteaux
2008
1st  National Road Race Championships
1st Riga Grand Prix
1st Stages 3, 4 & 6b Tour of Bulgaria
2009
1st Banja Luka-Belgrade I

References

1985 births
Living people
Latvian male cyclists